MUDI, short for Mudiaga, is a popular, award-winning Nigerian fashion brand with branches in Kenya, South Africa, Ghana, and Senegal, as well as its home country. The brand was launched in 1993 by Mudiaga Clement Enajemo. Enajemo was the first Nigerian designer to take his products abroad by opening stores in other countries.

Acclaim
Model and media presenter Mozez Praiz is MUDI's brand ambassador. The company's designs have been worn by celebrities such as King Mohammed V of Morocco, former President of Ghana John Kufuor, broadcaster Kwasi Kyei Darwkah, musicians Salif Keita and Youssou N'Dour, along with footballers John Obi Mikel, John Fashanu, and Kolo Toure. Actors and directors such as Richard Mofe-Damijo, Fred Amata, Basorge Tariah Jr., Ramsey Nouah, Desmond Elliot, and Olu Jacobs have also sported MUDI's garments.

In 2018, MUDI Africa named its newest collection after late Ghanaian international figure and former UN Secretary General Kofi Annan

Awards

 Best Clothing Line – Effizzie Magazine, 2009
 Fashion and Beauty Awards 2011 City People
 Dynamic Entrepreneurial Ingenuity (Government College) set of 1979 class, 2011
 Lagos State University Students representatives Council Award of Excellence, 2012
 Most Influential Person in Fashion, 2012
 Elegance and Style Award, 2011
 Fashion and Style Digest Award 2010,
 Entrepreneurship, Business Development & Innovations by PILAS, 2017
 Style and Substance Awards and Best Afrocentric Designer by ENCOMIUM's Black & White Ball
 Menswear Designer of the Year

References

Nigerian fashion designers